Lyon Township is an inactive township in Franklin County, in the U.S. state of Missouri.

Lyon Township was established in 1866, taking its name from Nathaniel Lyon, an officer in the Civil War.

References

Townships in Missouri
Townships in Franklin County, Missouri